The 1949 Paris–Roubaix was the 47th edition of the Paris–Roubaix, a classic one-day cycle race in France. The single day event was held on 17 April 1949 and stretched  from Paris to the finish at Roubaix Velodrome. The race was declared as a tie between the Italian cyclist Serse Coppi and the French cyclist André Mahé.

Results

References

Paris–Roubaix
Paris–Roubaix
Paris–Roubaix
Paris-Roubaix
Paris–Roubaix